Lapanquri is a village in the Telavi district of Georgia. It is located near the Alazani Valley.

Name
Its name probably derives from the Pterocarya trees (Georgian: ლაფანი lapani) which are found around the village.

Demography

Gallery

See also
 Telavi Municipality

External links

References 

Populated places in Telavi Municipality